Valeria Haistruk (born 20 July 1998) is a Ukrainian former competitive ice dancer. With Oleksii Oliinyk, she won the 2016 Ukrainian national title. They placed 14th at the 2015 World Junior Championships in Tallinn, Estonia, and 26th at the 2016 European Championships in Bratislava, Slovakia. They were coached by Maria Tumanovska.

Programs 
(with Oliinyk)

Competitive highlights 
CS: Challenger Series; JGP: Junior Grand Prix

With Oliinyk

References

External links 
 

1998 births
Ukrainian female ice dancers
Living people
Sportspeople from Kyiv